Joke chess problems are puzzles in chess that use humor as a primary or secondary element. Although most chess problems, like other creative forms, are appreciated for serious artistic themes (Grimshaw, Novotny, and Lacny), joke chess problems are enjoyed for some twist. In some cases the composer plays a trick to prevent a solver from succeeding with typical analysis. In other cases, the humor derives from an unusual final position. Unlike in ordinary chess puzzles, joke problems can involve a solution which violates the inner logic or rules of the game.

Self-solving problems

Some chess puzzles are not really puzzles at all. In the diagram, White is asked to checkmate Black in six moves. The joke in this case is that, by the rules of chess, White has no choice in the matter; the only legal moves lead directly to the "solution":
1. d4 b5 2. d5 b4 3. axb4 a3 4. b5 a2 5. b6 a1=any 6. b7

Tim Krabbé provides other examples on his chess website.

Offbeat interpretations of the rules of chess

The rules of chess are fairly simple and clearly defined. Nevertheless, this was not always the case, and some composers relied on ambiguities in the rules to create humorous puzzles. The diagram on the right shows one such example. According to chess legend, a composer stipulated, "White mates in one move." It appears to be impossible and now is, but when it was presented, the promotion rule did not specify the color of the piece to which a pawn may be promoted; thus, the "solution" is for White to promote to a black knight on b8, thus depriving the black king of a potential flight square. Similar (though non-loophole-based) problems have been created involving promotion to kings or pawns.

A more sophisticated example was composed by Tim Krabbé and relied on a loophole that supposedly existed in the definition of castling. In the diagram, White must mate in three moves. The solution begins 1. e7, then the main variations are:

In the last variation, White castles with their newly promoted rook, moving the king to e3 and the rook to e2. Krabbe claimed that under the rules of chess at the time, this move was arguably legal because the rook had not moved yet, and that afterward, FIDE amended the rules to require that the castling rook must occupy the same rank as the king. In reality, however, the original FIDE Laws from 1930 already stated that the rook and king had to occupy the same rank.

In the third diagram the solution begins with 1. e8=R Kb1 2. 0-0-0-0# moving the king to e3 and rook to e2.

Unusual piece placement or movement

Some problems are notable for extremely unusual patterns of piece placement. For example, direct mates and especially helpmates have been composed with the pieces in the shape of a letter or number, or even a tree.

The "back home task"

In this problem by M. Kirtley, the final position echoes a familiar pattern. Krabbé calls this problem the "back home task", as all eight white pieces retreat to their initial positions. He writes that "Strategy and deep themes are absent, Black only has forced moves, but it's one of the funniest chess problems I ever saw." White must selfmate in eight moves; i.e., they must force Black to checkmate White against Black's will. The solution is:
1. Nb1+ Kb3 2. Qd1+ Rc2 3. Bc1 axb6 4. Ra1 b5 5. Rh1 bxc4 6. Ke1 c3 7. Ng1 f3 8. Bf1 f2#

The "caterpillar theme"

Krabbé named the "caterpillar theme" for problems and studies where doubled or tripled pawns move one after the other. The diagram at the right shows a particularly silly example, with White forcing mate in six moves. The solution is:
1. Bb1 b2 2. Ra2 b3 3. Ra3 b4 4. Ra4 b5 5. Ra5 b6 6. Be4#

Krabbé wrote a whole article on the caterpillar theme, citing about ten examples.

The American composer William A. Shinkman (1847–1933) is famous for composing the problem in the diagram, with sextupled pawns on the a-file.  As Krabbé writes on his website, "The solution, as it should be in a joke, is not difficult: 1. 0-0-0 Kxa7 2. Rd8 Kxa6 3. Rd7 Kxa5 4. Rd6 Kxa4 5. Rd5 Kxa3 6. Rd4 Kxa2 7. Rd3 Ka1 8. Ra3#'''".

The problem is "" (ruined, in the lingo of chess composition), however, because 1.Kd2 also forces mate in eight moves. But this problem was not intended to be a sound mate in eight, and was instead intended to be a proof game in 34 moves with seven consecutive captures by Black.

Humour in more traditional chess problems
Humour is a component of some traditional themes, such as grotesque and Excelsior.

In 2004, Hans Böhm sponsored a chess composing tournament for humorous endgame studies. The top two entries appear with solutions on Krabbé's website.

Chess problem riddle

In this kind of problem, although the problem is posed as a standard chess problem, the solution has nothing to do with chess moves. An example is this problem composed by British composer Thomas Rayner Dawson:

The solution is in the words (i.e. it is a riddle): White did not lose the game of chess (which is impossible in the diagram position, as the only legal moves are 1.g7+ Qxg7+ 2.hxg7#), but rather the bet.

See also
Sam Loyd

Notes

References

Chess problems
Humour